Mueang Chai Nat is the capital district (amphoe mueang) of Chai Nat province, central Thailand.

Geography
Neighbouring districts are (from the east clockwise) Sapphaya, Sankhaburi, Hankha, Wat Sing, and Manorom of Chai Nat province; and Takhli of Nakhon Sawan province.

History
On 29 April 1917 the district's name was changed from Mueang to Ban Kluai (บ้านกล้วย). On 14 November 1938 it was renamed Mueang Chai Nat.

Administration
The district is divided into nine sub-districts (tambons), which are further subdivided into 81 villages (mubans). Chai Nat is a town (thesaban mueang) which covers tambon Nai Mueang and parts of Ban Kluai, Tha Chai, and Khao Tha Phra. There are a further eight tambon administrative organizations (TAO).

References

External links
amphoe.com (Thai)

Mueang Chai Nat